This article lists libraries, applications, and other software which enable or support arbitrary-precision arithmetic.

Libraries

Stand-alone application software
Software that supports arbitrary precision computations:

bc the POSIX arbitrary-precision arithmetic language that comes standard on most Unix-like systems.
dc: "Desktop Calculator" arbitrary-precision RPN calculator that comes standard on most Unix-like systems.
KCalc, Linux based scientific calculator
Maxima: a computer algebra system which bignum integers are directly inherited from its implementation language Common Lisp. In addition, it supports arbitrary-precision floating-point numbers, bigfloats.
Maple, Mathematica, and several other computer algebra software include arbitrary-precision arithmetic. Mathematica employs GMP for approximate number computation.
PARI/GP, an open source computer algebra system that supports arbitrary precision.
 Qalculate!, an open-source free software arbitrary precision calculator with autocomplete.
 SageMath, an open-source computer algebra system
SymPy, a CAS
Symbolic Math toolbox (MATLAB)
Windows Calculator, since Windows 98, uses arbitrary precision for basic operations (addition, subtraction, multiplication, division) and 32 digits of precision for advanced operations (square root, transcendental functions).
SmartXML, a free programming language with integrated development environment (IDE) for mathematical calculations. Variables of BigNumber type can be used, or regular numbers can be converted to big numbers using conversion operator # (e.g., #2.3^2000.1). SmartXML big numbers can have up to 100,000,000 decimal digits and up to 100,000,000 whole digits.

Languages
Programming languages that support arbitrary precision computations, either built-in, or in the standard library of the language:

Ada: the upcoming Ada 202x revision adds the Ada.Numerics.Big_Numbers.Big_Integers and Ada.Numerics.Big_Numbers.Big_Reals packages to the standard library, providing arbitrary precision integers and real numbers.
Agda: the BigInt datatype on Epic backend implements arbitrary-precision arithmetic.
Common Lisp: The ANSI Common Lisp standard supports arbitrary precision integer, ratio, and complex numbers.
C#: System.Numerics.BigInteger, from .NET 5
ColdFusion: the built-in PrecisionEvaluate() function evaluates one or more string expressions, dynamically, from left to right, using BigDecimal precision arithmetic to calculate the values of arbitrary precision arithmetic expressions.
D: standard library module std.bigint
Dart: the built-in int datatype implements arbitrary-precision arithmetic.
Emacs Lisp: supports integers of arbitrary size, starting with Emacs 27.1.
Erlang: the built-in Integer datatype implements arbitrary-precision arithmetic.
Go: the standard library package math/big implements arbitrary-precision integers (Int type), rational numbers (Rat type), and floating-point numbers (Float type)
Guile: the built-in exact numbers are of arbitrary precision. Example: (expt 10 100) produces the expected (large) result. Exact numbers also include rationals, so (/ 3 4) produces 3/4. One of the languages implemented in Guile is Scheme.
Haskell: the built-in Integer datatype implements arbitrary-precision arithmetic and the standard Data.Ratio module implements rational numbers.
Idris: the built-in Integer datatype implements arbitrary-precision arithmetic.
ISLISP: The ISO/IEC 13816:1997(E) ISLISP standard supports arbitrary precision integer numbers.
J: built-in extended precision
Java: Class  (integer),  Class (decimal)
JavaScript: as of ES2020, BigInt is supported in most browsers; the gwt-math library provides an interface to java.math.BigDecimal, and libraries such as DecimalJS, BigInt and Crunch support arbitrary-precision integers.
Julia: the built-in BigFloat and BigInt types provide arbitrary-precision floating point and integer arithmetic respectively.
newRPL: integers and floats can be of arbitrary precision (up to at least 2000 digits); maximum number of digits configurable (default 32 digits)
Nim: bigints and multiple GMP bindings.
OCaml: The Num library supports arbitrary-precision integers and rationals.
OpenLisp: supports arbitrary precision integer numbers.
Perl: The bignum and bigrat pragmas provide BigNum and BigRational support for Perl.
PHP: The BC Math module provides arbitrary precision mathematics.
PicoLisp: supports arbitrary precision integers.
Pike: the built-in int type will silently change from machine-native integer to arbitrary precision as soon as the value exceeds the former's capacity.
Prolog: ISO standard compatible Prolog systems can check the Prolog flag "bounded". Most of the major Prolog systems support arbitrary precision integer numbers.
Python: the built-in int (3.x) / long (2.x) integer type is of arbitrary precision. The Decimal class in the standard library module decimal has user definable precision and limited mathematical operations (exponentiation, square root, etc. but no trigonometric functions). The Fraction class in the module fractions implements rational numbers. More extensive arbitrary precision floating point arithmetic is available with the third-party "mpmath" and "bigfloat" packages.
Racket: the built-in exact numbers are of arbitrary precision. Example: (expt 10 100) produces the expected (large) result. Exact numbers also include rationals, so (/ 3 4) produces 3/4. Arbitrary precision floating point numbers are included in the standard library math/bigfloat module.
Raku: Rakudo supports Int and FatRat data types that promote to arbitrary-precision integers and rationals.
Rexx: variants including Open Object Rexx and NetRexx
RPL (only on HP 49/50 series in exact mode): calculator treats numbers entered without decimal point as integers rather than floats; integers are of arbitrary precision only limited by the available memory.
Ruby: the built-in Bignum integer type is of arbitrary precision. The BigDecimal class in the standard library module bigdecimal has user definable precision.
Scheme: R5RS encourages, and R6RS requires, that exact integers and exact rationals be of arbitrary precision.
Scala: Class BigInt and Class BigDecimal.
Seed7: bigInteger and bigRational.
Self: arbitrary precision integers are supported by the built-in bigInt type.
Smalltalk: variants including Squeak, Smalltalk/X, GNU Smalltalk, Dolphin Smalltalk, etc.
SmartXML, a free programming language with integrated development environment (IDE) for mathematical calculations. Variables of BigNumber type can be used, or regular numbers can be converted to big numbers using conversion operator # (e.g., #2.3^2000.1). SmartXML big numbers can have up to 100,000,000 decimal digits and up to 100,000,000 whole digits.
Standard ML: The optional built-in IntInf structure implements the INTEGER signature and supports arbitrary-precision integers.
Tcl: As of version 8.5 (2007), integers are arbitrary-precision by default. (Behind the scenes, the language switches to using an arbitrary-precision internal representation for integers too large to fit in a machine word. Bindings from C should use library functions such as Tcl_GetLongFromObj to get values as C-native data types from Tcl integers.)
Wolfram Language, like Mathematica, employs GMP for approximate number computation.

Online calculators
For one-off calculations. Runs on server or in browser. No installation or compilation required.
 1. https://www.mathsisfun.com/calculator-precision.html 200 places
 2. http://birrell.org/andrew/ratcalc/ arbitrary; select rational or fixed-point and number of places
 3. PARI/GP online calculator -  https://pari.math.u-bordeaux.fr/gp.html (PARI/GP is a widely used computer algebra system designed for fast computations in number theory (factorizations, algebraic number theory, elliptic curves, modular forms, L functions...), but also contains a large number of other useful functions to compute with mathematical entities such as matrices, polynomials, power series, algebraic numbers etc., and a lot of transcendental functions. PARI is also available as a C library to allow for faster computations.)
 4.1. AutoCalcs - allow users to Search, Create, Store and Share multi-step calculations using explicit expressions featuring automated Unit Conversion. It is a platform that allows users to go beyond unit conversion, which in turn brings in significantly improved efficiency. A lot of sample calculations can be found at AutoCalcs Docs site. Calculations created with AutoCalcs can be embedded into 3rd party websites.
 4.2. AutoCalcs Docs - considering above mentioned AutoCalcs as the calculation engine, this Docs site is a library with a host of calculations, where each calculation is essentially a web app that can run online, be further customized, and much more. Imaging reading a book with a lot of calculations, then this is the book/manual with all calculations that can be used on the fly. It is worthwhile to mention - when units are involved in the calculations, the unit conversion can be automated.

References

Lists of software
Computer arithmetic